NGC 400 is a star located in the constellation of Pisces. It was discovered on December 30, 1866 by Robert Ball.

References

0400
18661230
NGC 400
Discoveries by Robert Stawell Ball